Marcin Dymkowski (born 10 March 1981) is a Polish football manager and former player, currently serving as an assistant coach of Śląsk Wrocław.

Career

Club
In June 2010, he joined Pogoń Szczecin on a one-year contract. He was released from Pogoń on 10.06.2011.

In July 2011, he moved to Sandecja Nowy Sącz on a one-year contract.

References

External links
 
 

Living people
1981 births
Sportspeople from Wrocław
Polish footballers
Association football defenders
Śląsk Wrocław players
Miedź Legnica players
Odra Wodzisław Śląski players
Lech Poznań players
Pogoń Szczecin players
Sandecja Nowy Sącz players
MKS Kluczbork players
Ekstraklasa players
I liga players
II liga players
Polish football managers